Henry Frith (2 May 184012 October 1917) was an Irish engineer who translated the works of Jules Verne and others, as well as writing his own works. His prolific output amounted to nearly 200 works between translations, novels, and instructional titles.

Early life
Frith was born in Dublin, Ireland, on 2 May 1840, at 2, Upper Leeson Street. He was the second son of Henry Frith and Frances (née Winter). Of his four siblings only two, his eldest and youngest brothers survived to adulthood. His father worked in the Ordnance Office in Dublin. Frith was educated at Cheltenham College and entered Trinity College Dublin on 1 July 1857 to train as a Civil Engineer. Applying for a Civil Service post, he was appointed to the War Office in London, where he remained until 1875 when he retired with a pension and began his literary efforts.

Frith married Mary Lowndes (April 18447 June 1928) on 25 May 1869 in Hove, Sussex, England. Mary was the third daughter of  William Lowndes (1807–1864) and Marth Sutton (1807–1890). The Lowndes were wealthy, being the ground landlords for Knightsbridge in London. When Mary's step-brother William Lowndes (1834–1905) died, his estate was valued at £452,310. He not only left £7,000 to each of his three half sisters, but also left his real estate (the Knightsbridge ground rents, and the Bury house) together with the residue of his personal estate to her eldest son William Frederick.

The couple had six children:
Ida Mary Frith (1870–1963)
William Frederick Lowndes Frith (1871–1956) Changed his surname from Frith to Frith Lowndes in 1906. This was at the request of his step-uncle William Lowndes's will which made William his heir.
Ernest Henry Frith (1874–1926)
Lilian Adela Frith (1880–1962)
Roland Girdlestone Frith (1884–1947) Moved to the US
Percival Lowndes Frith (1886–1954)

Works
Frith originally trained as an engineer, and worked for the War Office until 1875 when he qualified for a pension. The way in which he described himself changed over time:
1870 Baptismal record: Gentleman
1871 Census: Civil ServantWar Office
1871 Baptismal record: Gentleman
1874 Baptismal record: Manager to a Public Company
1881 Census: Author, Editor, Publisher's Reader
1884 Baptismal record: Author
1886 Baptismal record: Authorship
1891 Census: Literature
1896 Marriage Record for Frederick: Author
1901 Census: Retired Author
1908 Marriage record for Ida: Gentleman
1911 Census: Retired Civil ServantWar Office

Frith's enormous volume of work, with nearly 200 books to his credit consists of:
Translations, from French, of novels and instructional works.
Novels, mostly juvenile fiction
Entertaining non-fiction, usually for younger readers
Instructional non-fiction

He also produced some albums, and books that don't fit easily in these four categories. Frith freely made us of the work of others in his non-fiction works, and some of them were encyclopaedic in tone briefly covering a wide range of issues in a topic. In his preface to Ascents and Adventures: a record of hardy mountaineering in every quarter of the globe he says: The following pages do not profess to be a record of our own personal adventures. They include many experiences of a varied character in Europe, Asia, and America; but while making use of the narratives and notes of more experienced climbers, without copying their work; we have in some cases embodied the spirit of it, and fixed it in our pages for the amusement, and it may be for the instruction, of young people.

Translations
The first of Frith's works that is catalogued at the British Library is an 1875 translation of Les Braves Gens by Jules Girardin. This was translated as The Adventures of Johnny Ironsides in English. Frith followed this in 1976 with a translation of two of Jules Verne's stories in the following year: Une Ville flottante and Les Forceurs de blocus as A Floating City and the Blockade Runners.

Frith translated another five workes by Verne:
1876: Vingt mille lieues sur les mers as Twenty Thousand Leagues Under the Seas. 
1877: Aventures de trois Russes et de trois Anglais as Adventures of Three Englishmen and Three Russians in Southern Africa
1878: Le Tour du monde en quatre-vingts jours as Round the World in Eighty Days
1879: Le Pays des fourrures as The Fur Country
1884: Kéraban-le-têtu as Kéraban the Inflexible
The Encyclopedia of Science Fiction suggests that Frith may have translated Verne's Five Weeks in a Balloon, but neither Wolcott nor Evans include it on their lists.

Wolcott rated Frith's translation of Vingt mille lieues sur les mers as a translation of particular merit and said of him: With his scientific background he understood much of what Verne had written, and this translation has remained one of the best of the time with only minor deletions from the original text.

Frith also translated works by:

Joséphine-Blanche Colomb
Alphonse Daudet
Alexandre Dumas
Léon Gautier
Jules Girardin
Adrien Paul
Philippe Daryl 
Gaston Tissandier

P. Villars

Novels
Most of Frith's novels fall in to the boys' adventure category. As with the lists in the following sections, the list of titles are not meant to be comprehensive, but to give the reader a flavour of the range of Frith's output:
Aboard the Atlanta: The Story of a Truant
The Captain of Cadets
A cruise in Cloudland
In the Yellow Sea: a tale of the Japanese war
The Lost Trader: or, the mystery of the “Lombardy,” etc.
The Hunting of the “Hydra,” or the Phantom Prahu

Entertaining non-fiction
The entertaining non-fiction was mostly aimed at a juvenile audience. The titles included:
The Biography of a Locomotive Engineer
The Romance of Engineering
The Romance of Navigation
Coil and Current
Half Hours of Scientific Amusement (translated from a book by Gaston Tissandier
Ascents and Adventures
Haunted Ancestral Homes: True Ghost Stories
Chivalry (translated from a book by Léon Gautier
King Arthur and His Knights

Instructional non-fiction
Friths instructional non-fiction has been quite long-lived, with new editions, sometimes revised, long after his death. The titles include:
Speeches and Toasts: how to make and propose them 
The Chairman's Guide and Secretary's Companion
The Complete Letter-Writer for Ladies and Gentlemen
Chiromancy: or the science of palmistry 
How to read Character in Handwriting

Death
Frith died, aged 78, on 12 October 1917. He was still living at Shenstone House, Amersham Common. He was survived by his wife Mary who administered his estate of £2,335 4s 10d. The Buckinhamshire Examiner espressed sympathy with his son William Frederick. Mary survived Frith by another 11 years, dying on 7 June 1928.

References

External links
 
 Works by Henry Frith on the Internet Archive
 Full View texts by Henry Frith at Hathi Trust

1840 births
1917 deaths
Writers from Dublin (city)
Alumni of Trinity College Dublin
Irish civil engineers
19th-century Irish writers
19th-century male writers
Irish children's writers
Irish translators
Children's non-fiction writers
Translators from French
Science fiction translators
Translators of Jules Verne
Translators to English